Bēne Manor is a manor house in Bēne parish, Auce Municipality in the historical region of Zemgale, in Latvia.  Bēne manor was established at the end of the 16th century, upon collapse of the Livonian Order and formation of the Duchy of Courland.

History 
Bēne Manor was established in the late 16th century, after collapse of Livonian Order. When Duchy of Kurzeme - Zemgale was formed, Manor was created on the lands cultivated by the advisor to the Courland ruler Dr. Berg. In 1597 he received the county he had already acquired from the Duke Friedrich for use, along with the rights to use  timber and firewood from the crown forest. King of Poland Władysław IV Vasa in 1633 made a final designation of property ownership.

At the beginning of the 19th century, lands in Auce Municipality  belonged to the Medem noble family. Count Friedrich von Medem owned the palaces of Vecauce and Eleja, as well as the manors of Bēne, Jaunauce, Ķevele and Vītiņi.
In 1873 Jelgava-Mažeikiai railway was opened. At that time, the owner of the Bēne Manor was Baron August von der Reck.
The last owner of the Bēne Manor house was Baron von Birkenstein.
The land of the manor was divided among the young farmers and   part of the Bēne manor was rented out.
From 1922 manor tenant was Otto Valdemārs Gailītis. The ruined and desolate farm, which was then called the Cultural Center of Bēne, was transformed into a model farm, receiving government awards. On his initiative, he started sugar beet growing, established the most modern dairy in the Baltic States and began electrification of Bēne.

See also
List of palaces and manor houses in Latvia

References

External links

Manor houses in Latvia